Kether is a video game developed by Infogrames and published by Philips for the CD-i.

Gameplay
Kether is a game that mixes elements of both action and graphic adventure.

Reception

Next Generation reviewed the game, rating it three stars out of five, and stated that "Challenging puzzles and a mystical atmosphere round out the title into a CD-i adventure that's a cut above many of its peers."

Reviews
Electronic Gaming Monthly #56 (1994 March)
Edge #4
Video Games & Computer Entertainment - Mar, 1994
The Video Game Critic
Defunct Games
The Good Old Days
Oldies Rising

References

External links
 https://www.gamespot.com/kether/

1993 video games
CD-i games
First-person shooters
Space combat simulators
Video games developed in France